Kismayo District is a district in the southern Jubbada Hoose region of Somalia. Its capital is Kismayo.

References

External links
 Districts of Somalia
 Administrative map of Kismayo District

Districts of Somalia

Lower Juba